Innoventions was a two-story exhibit in Tomorrowland at Disneyland in Anaheim, California. It opened on July 3, 1998 as part of the New Tomorrowland, focusing on near-futuristic technologies. The attraction operated for nearly 17 years, closing on March 31, 2015. From 2013 until its closure, its focus mainly shifted to character meet-and-greets featuring superheroes from the Marvel Cinematic Universe. It occupied the Carousel Theater, a round two-story building in which the outer half of the first floor rotates. A similar attraction of the same name existed in Epcot at the Walt Disney World Resort until 2019.

History
From 1967 to 1973, the building housed Walt Disney's Carousel of Progress. This attraction was moved from Disneyland to its current location in Magic Kingdom at the Walt Disney World Resort in 1973, at the request of its sponsor, General Electric. America Sings occupied the building from the following year until 1988. Audio-Animatronics from the show were used in Disneyland's Splash Mountain. The upper level of the building continued to house the Tron SuperSpeed Tunnel segment of the PeopleMover until that attraction eventually closed in 1995. The attraction closed March 31, 2015.

The building was redesigned and reopened on November 16, 2015 as the Tomorrowland Expo Center. The first floor of the building hosts Star Wars Launch Bay, a Star Wars exhibit featuring peeks behind the scenes and character meet and greets with Darth Vader, Kylo Ren, Boba Fett, and Chewbacca, while the second floor hosted "Super Hero HQ", featuring meet and greets with Marvel characters Thor and Spider-Man and an exhibit featuring Iron Man's suits based on the film. Super Hero HQ closed in April 2016.

Attraction
The first floor hosted the Dream Home in alliance with Microsoft, HP, and Taylor Morrison. Keeping with Walt Disney's vision of bringing cutting-edge, inspiring ideas to Tomorrowland, the Innoventions Dream Home introduced Disneyland guests to then-newly available technology from the participating companies that would enhance their lives, while providing them a glimpse of the emerging digital advances they may find in their homes in the future. The attraction provided guests with a "high-tech, high-touch" opportunity to experience technology in an entertaining, low-risk environment showing them how the power of technology could connect them to the people and things they care most about.

Guests who entered the Innoventions building were greeted by Tom Morrow, an Audio-Animatronic voiced by Nathan Lane, who was the fictional mayor of Tomorrowland. He explained Innoventions in a comedic style and performed an updated version of the Sherman Brothers song "There's a Great Big Beautiful Tomorrow" from the original Carousel of Progress. Updated version included lyrics which differed depending on which area of the building you entered. Lyrics are below:

SPORTS SECTION
Get on your marks, get set and go! / For sports and fitness, you're in the know / If feeling fit is how you want to stay / Let those Innoventions help you play

HOME SECTION
Step through door of your new home / Robotically cleaned from floor to dome / Your lawn's being trimmed automatically / Now there's more free time for you and me

EDUCATION SECTION
When you are born, the learning starts / You go off to school to get your smarts / You'll launch a career, it's a snap to do / Just let Innoventions work for you

TRANSPORTATION SECTION Welcome aboard, we're on our way / Hello tomorrow, goodbye today / A world on the move is our destiny / Over land, or sky, or deep blue sea

ENTERTAINMENT SECTION Come to the stage and silver screen / You're just in time for our op'ning scene / Tomorrow's the star, it's about to go / So let's hit the lights and start the show

Beginning in 2012, the Tom Morrow Audio-Animatronic was removed from display and is no longer part of the attraction. The building used the same rotation mechanism built in 1967 for the Carousel of Progress. In the past, the outer portion of the first floor would stop rotating during the evening, but in later years, it stopped rotating altogether due to a change in operation, with guests entering on the second floor.

Once Innoventions was refurbished and remodeled into both Super Hero HQ (upper level) and Star Wars Launch Bay (lower level), guests were allowed to enter the building from the first floor again and were given the opportunity to enter the worlds from both the Marvel Cinematic Universe and the Star Wars universe in November 2015. In the Super Hero HQ location, guests were able to meet Captain America, Thor, and Spider-Man. Guests were also able to embody Iron Man in The Iron Man Experience, which had guests partake in a simulator that enabled them to fly. Guests were also able to purchase Marvel merchandise.

The lower level gives guests the opportunity to meet Darth Vader, Chewbacca, and Boba Fett. The location opened with these characters in the winter of 2015. January 2016 saw the addition of Kylo Ren (who replaced Darth Vader until mid-October 2016). In addition to this, Jawas have been introduced roaming around the Cantina area with Boba Fett. Rey has also been added in and greets guests daily.  Guests are given a variety of exhibits, such as props and costumes used in the films, and an area to buy Star Wars merchandise. Super Hero HQ closed in April 2016.

Gallery

Former exhibits and sponsors
 1998–2000: Honeywell sponsored playground
 1998–2000: Silicon Graphics sponsored A Bug's Life Exhibit (designed and produced by Santeler Marketing Group)
 1998–2004: General Motors simulator attraction
 1998–2007: Hewlett Packard-sponsored (formerly Compaq) free computer game arcade
 2000–2007: AT&T–Hyperlink Hopscotch, previously an interactive cartoon show.
 2000–2007: Pioneer "Virtual Resort", guests experience a virtual reality vacation
 2000–2013:  St. Joseph Hospital's Healthy University, where guests visited different stations themed as part of a school that promoted healthy living. Guests could calculate their BMI, learn about exercise on a stationary bike, play virtual sports games, and have a chance to see themselves 50 years in the future.
 2004–2005, 2007–2008: Segway track, where guests 16 and older could ride a Segway
 2005–2007: VMK Central (closed on June 3, 2007, scheduled to be a limited time only )
 2005–2009: Talk to Stitch, an interactive experience in which guests could talk to Stitch from Disney's Lilo & Stitch using technology similar to that of Turtle Talk with Crush at Disney California Adventure
2005–2015: Honda ASIMO theater, a 15-minute presentation on the state-of-the-art ASIMO robot
 2007–2015: Siemens AG Project Tomorrow, featuring some of the same games as its counterpart at Spaceship Earth (Epcot). During its run, Project Tomorrow featured:
Power City, a large digital "shuffleboard-style" game that had guests push "power pucks" into targets to provide energy to neighborhoods and create the largest city possible. The more neighborhoods that were powered, the higher the city's population became. The largest city attainable was Tokyo, which required the population to reach 10 million.
Body Builder, a 3-D game allowing guests to build a digital human body. It featured the voice of Wallace Shawn as "Dr. Bones."
Super Driver, a driving simulation video game featuring vehicle accident and avoidance systems.
A large glass globe with digitally projected images coming from within it. Below it were consoles that took photographs of guests, asked a series of questions about each guest, and superimposed the automatically cropped images of their faces onto an animated vision of the future. These consoles utilized the same system as the one used during the descent of Spaceship Earth 

 2008-2011: The Neighborhood at Innoventions, where guests watched and sometimes participated in live shows about Taylor Morrison homes, Yamaha musical instruments, ABC multi-format programming (in the form of a trivia game show), Honda, or Southern California Edison, depending on which of the five zones into which they entered.

 2008–2015: Taylor Morrison / Microsoft Innoventions Dream Home (sponsored by HP, Microsoft, and Taylor Morrison), a house filled with the latest technology that was either on the market or soon to be available. The house was inhabited by the fictional Elias family, which hosted an open house to show off their newly acquired technology. Gadgets included 
Four Microsoft Surface tables which were connected in a single dining room table
A 100-inch, 1080p rear-projector screen
Control4 panels in every room connecting to photo frames, lights, window shades, and speakers (previously Life|ware)
A "Magic Mirror" that placed virtual three-dimensional pieces of clothing on a body-mapped subject
A bedroom that came to life with the story of Peter Pan
A kitchen featuring a countertop voice-activated cookbook, an internet-connected bulletin board, and Siemens appliances, including the Liftmatic Oven
Michael Jackson: The Experience and video games in the party tent
 2013–2016: Thor: Treasures of Asgard, a promotional exhibit to commemorate the release of Marvel's Thor: The Dark World.
 2013–2016: Iron Man Tech Presented by Stark Industries, a promotional exhibit to commentate the release of Marvel's Iron Man 3. Paul Bettany provides the voice of J.A.R.V.I.S.
 2014–2015: Captain America: The Living Legend and Symbol of Courage, a promotional exhibit to commemorate the release of Marvel's Captain America: The Winter Soldier.

References

Amusement rides introduced in 1998
Amusement rides that closed in 2015
Former Walt Disney Parks and Resorts attractions
Disneyland
Tomorrowland
Audio-Animatronic attractions
Attractions based on Star Wars
Marvel Comics in amusement parks
1998 establishments in California
2015 disestablishments in California

fr:Innoventions#Disneyland